is a 2004 Japanese romantic comedy film directed by Yuki Tanada. It was released on December 25.

Cast
Noriko Eguchi as Mayama
Tasuku Nagaoka as Tadokoro
Misako Hirata
Yoshikazu Ebisu
Shungiku Uchida
Akira Emoto as Sakamoto

Reception
Tom Mes of Midnight Eye called the film "a lively, hugely enjoyable romp".

References

External links

2004 romantic comedy films
2004 films
Japanese romantic comedy films
Works by Yuki Tanada
2000s Japanese films
2000s Japanese-language films